Union Township is a township in Lewis County, in the U.S. state of Missouri.

Union Township was established in 1833.

References

Townships in Missouri
Townships in Lewis County, Missouri